Mad at the Moon is a 1992 American Western-romantic horror film co-written and directed by Martin Donovan. It stars Mary Stuart Masterson, Hart Bochner and Fionnula Flanagan.

Synopsis

In 1892, Jenny Hill (Masterson), a young woman living on the frontier, is infatuated with Miller Brown, the local outlaw. However, her mother (Flanagan) strongly disapproves and marries her off to Miller’s half-brother, James Miller, who is an apparently meek farmer. James Miller loves Jenny, but his love is not reciprocated by her. Eventually, Jenny discovers James' hidden secret of being a werewolf, and asks for Miller Brown's help to protect her from his half-brother.

Cast
 Mary Stuart Masterson ... Jenny Hill
 Hart Bochner ... Miller Brown
 Fionnula Flanagan ... Mrs. Hill
 Stephen Blake ... James Miller
 Cec Verrell ... Sally
 Daphne Zuniga ... Young Mrs. Miller
 Eleanor Baggett ... Older Mrs. Miller
 Pat Atkins ... Mrs. Russell
 Morgan Stuart ... Young Jenny
 Ryan Slater ... Young James
 Jonathan Tripp ... Opera Singer
 Janet Momjian ... Opera Singer
 Raymond De Felitta ... Piano Player
 Jacqueline Stansbury ... Saloon Girl (as Jackie Stansbury)
 Alix Koromzay ... Saloon Girl
 Kathy Messick ... Saloon Girl
 Melissa Moore ... Miss Saunders (as Melissa Anne Moore)
 Stephen Cole ... Priest

Release

Reception

Mad at the Moon received mixed to negative reviews from critics upon its release. 
Derek Elley from Variety wrote a particularly scathing review, stating, "A bad attack of miscasting and some klutzy development take[s] the shine out of Mad at the Moon... Slimly plotted item may attract the midnight crowd at specialized outings but is unlikely to raise much of a howl with mainstream audiences."

TV Guide awarded the film a mixed two out of five stars, commending the film's ambiance, and cinematography; while criticizing the film's underdeveloped plot, minimal character development, and abrupt ending. Fred Beldin from Allmovie gave the film a more positive review, commending the film's cast, cinematography, and soundtrack, writing "While horror and Western fans won't have much patience with this deliberately paced romantic drama, Mad at the Moon is a unique meld of genre influences that succeeds on its own terms."

References

External links
 
 
 
 

1992 films
1992 direct-to-video films
1992 horror films
1990s Western (genre) horror films
American Western (genre) horror films
American romantic drama films
American supernatural horror films
Direct-to-video horror films
Films set in 1892
Films shot in California
American romantic horror films
American werewolf films
Films directed by Martin Donovan (screenwriter)
1990s English-language films
1990s American films